Devon station is a commuter rail station in Devon, Pennsylvania, United States. It could also refer to:

 Devon railway station, a disused train station in Victoria, Australia
 Devon station (Ontario), a train station in Devon, Ontario, Canada